Eugenio Peralta Cabrera (born 16 December 1977) is a Paraguayan footballer who plays for Inter Club d'Escaldes in the Andorran Primera Divisió.

Club career
Costa Rican side LD Alajuelense had announced the signing of Peralta on a six-month contract in January 2009, but he refused to join the club after his family expressed fears he might be injured in an earthquake. Peralta had previously experienced a deadly earthquake while he was with Cienciano in Peru during 2007.

References

External links
Eugenio Peralta at La Preferente
Eugenio Peralta at BDFA

1977 births
Living people
Paraguayan footballers
Paraguayan expatriate footballers
All Boys footballers
Club Atlético Tigre footballers
Cienciano footballers
Deportivo Pereira footballers
Deportivo Pasto footballers
Deportivo Paraguayo footballers
Defensores de Belgrano footballers
Sud América players
Defensores Unidos footballers
Deportivo Laferrere footballers
Villa Dálmine footballers
Club Atlético San Miguel footballers
Sacachispas Fútbol Club players
Club Luján footballers
Club Ferrocarril Midland players
FC Lusitanos players
FC Encamp players
Inter Club d'Escaldes players
Categoría Primera A players
Primera Nacional players
Primera Divisió players
Paraguayan expatriate sportspeople in Argentina
Paraguayan expatriate sportspeople in Colombia
Paraguayan expatriate sportspeople in Uruguay
Paraguayan expatriate sportspeople in Peru
Expatriate footballers in Argentina
Expatriate footballers in Colombia
Expatriate footballers in Uruguay
Expatriate footballers in Peru
Expatriate footballers in Moldova
Association football forwards
Paraguayan expatriate sportspeople in Andorra
Paraguayan expatriate sportspeople in Moldova
Expatriate footballers in Andorra